KF Spartak Tirana is an Albanian football club based the capital city Tirana. They currently compete in the Kategoria e Tretë.

History
The club was founded in 1950 as the team of the trade unions. Spartak Tirana managed to play in the years 1954, 1955 and 1957 in the Kategoria Superiore. Due to the reorganisation of sports teams in 1959-1960, most of the best players of Spartak Tirana transferred to 17 Nëntori (today Sportklub Tirana).

The club was dissolved in 1959, and was refounded in 2012. A group of people passionate about football and football history (Artan Vangjeli, Telman Perleka, Rezart Sejdini, Leonard Haroku, Gilbert Hysko) with the sponsorship of the IDS Company (run by Agron Shehaj and Fatmir Lamcja) formed the football team, which currently competes in the Kategoria e Tretë.

Honours

Domestic
Albanian First Division
Winners (2): 1953, 1956
Albanian Third Division
Winners (1): 2016 - 2017

Seasons

Notable players
  Loro Boriçi (1957)
  Isuf Borova (1957)

Notable managers
  Hivzi Sakiqi (1956)
  Loro Boriçi (1957)
  Adem Karapici (1953)

Current squad

 
(Captain)

Managers

Sponsorship 

Main sponsor: non
Official shirt manufacturer: Givova

See also
FK Partizani Tirana
KF Tirana
FK Dinamo Tirana

References

 
Football clubs in Tirana
Defunct football clubs in Albania
Association football clubs established in 1946
Association football clubs disestablished in 2020
1946 establishments in Albania
2020 disestablishments in Albania
Albanian Third Division clubs
Association football clubs disestablished in 1959
Association football clubs established in 2012